William Vaughan may refer to:

William Vaughan (philanthropist) (died 1580), English landowner, farmer and philanthropist
Sir William Vaughan (writer) (1575–1641), Welsh writer and colonial investor
Sir William Vaughan (Royalist) (died 1649), English royalist commander in the First English Civil War
William Gwyn Vaughan (1680s–1753), Welsh politician
William Vaughan (MP) (c. 1707–1775), Member of Parliament for and Lord Lieutenant of Merioneth
William Vaughan (merchant) (1752–1850), English West India merchant and author
William Vaughan (bishop) (1814–1902), Roman Catholic Bishop of Plymouth
William Wirt Vaughan (1831–1878), member of the United States House of Representatives
William Wyamar Vaughan (1865–1938), British educationalist
William Vaughan (footballer)  (1898 – 1976), English footballer
William E. Vaughan (1915–1977), American columnist and author
William Vaughan (art historian) (fl. 1972–2015), British art historian
William Edward Vaughan (fl. 1984–2013), Irish historian

See also
William Vaughn (disambiguation)